David Platt (born 22 April 1967) is an English-born Australian professional darts player who competed plays in events of the World Darts Federation (WDF).

Career
Platt competed at the 2003 PDC World Darts Championship, where he was defeated in the first round by Steve Brown of the United States. He returned to the World Championship in 2006, again losing in the first round to defending champion Phil Taylor.

Platt emigrated from England to Perth in Western Australia in the middle of 2009, and began competing in Darts Players Australia (DPA) events the following year.

Platt finished second behind Corey Cadby in the 2016 DPA Australian Grand Prix rankings, having led the standings heading into the final two ranking events of the year. He went on to win the Oceanic Masters, defeating New Zealand's Cody Harris in the final, to qualify for the 2017 PDC World Championship. After defeating John Bowles by a score of 2 sets to nil in the preliminary round, Platt lost to Taylor by a score of 3 sets to nil in a rematch of his first-round match in 2006.

World Championship results

PDC

 2003: First round (lost to Steve Brown 2–4) (sets)
 2006: First round (lost to Phil Taylor 0–3)
 2017: First round (lost to Phil Taylor 0–3)

References

External links

1967 births
Living people
Australian darts players
English darts players
Professional Darts Corporation former pro tour players
English expatriates in Australia
Place of birth missing (living people)